Harold William Vorster is a South African rugby union player for the  in the United Rugby Championship and the  in the Currie Cup. His regular position is centre or fly-half.

Career

Youth level
He represented  at various youth levels, from the Under-13 Craven Week in 2006 to the Under-18 Craven Week in 2011.

S.A. Under-20
He was included in the training group that toured Argentina in preparation for the 2013 IRB Junior World Championship.

Golden Lions
He was also included in the  squad for the 2013 Lions Challenge Series.

Super Rugby
He made his run-on debut for the Lions against the Stormers on 28 February 2015 at Ellispark.

Honours
 Currie Cup winner (2021)
 United Rugby Championship runner-up 2021-22

References

South African rugby union players
Living people
1993 births
Golden Lions players
Rugby union centres
Lions (United Rugby Championship) players
Saitama Wild Knights players
Bulls (rugby union) players
Blue Bulls players
Rugby union players from Limpopo